Dimitri Mbuyu (born 31 October 1964) is a retired Belgian footballer of Congolese origin. He played as an attacker.

He was the first black player to be selected for Belgium, appearing in one international, a 1–0 loss to Portugal on 4 February 1987 in Braga.

Club career
Former player for KSC Lokeren, he later took over as manager of FC Brussels, after having been coach at KFC Verbroedering Geel during the 2000–2001 season, and caretaker manager of the same club.

References

External links
 Profile & stats – Lokeren
 Profile – Standard
 Profile & stats – FC Brugge
 Profile & stats – FC Antwerp
 

1964 births
Living people
People from Berchem
Belgian people of Democratic Republic of the Congo descent
Association football forwards
Belgian footballers
Belgian expatriate footballers
Belgium international footballers
Belgian Pro League players
Challenger Pro League players
K.S.C. Lokeren Oost-Vlaanderen players
Standard Liège players
Club Brugge KV players
K.S.V. Waregem players
Royal Antwerp F.C. players
PAOK FC players
Maccabi Netanya F.C. players
HSV Hoek players
Expatriate footballers in Greece
Expatriate footballers in Israel
Expatriate footballers in the Netherlands
Belgian football managers
Footballers from Antwerp